Harry Lambert Gaspar (April 28, 1883 – May 14, 1940) was a professional baseball player.  He was a right-handed pitcher over parts of four seasons (1909–1912) with the Cincinnati Reds.  For his career, he compiled a 46–48 record in 143 appearances, with a 2.69 earned run average and 228 strikeouts.

Gaspar was born in Kingsley, Iowa, and later died in Orange, California at the age of 57.

See also
 List of Major League Baseball annual saves leaders

References

1883 births
1940 deaths
Major League Baseball pitchers
Baseball players from Iowa
Cincinnati Reds players
Minor league baseball managers
Wausau Lumberjacks players
Waterloo Cubs players
Waterloo Lulus players
Toronto Maple Leafs (International League) players
Sioux City Indians players
Freeport Pretzels players